The Statue of Liberty is a colossal statue in New York Harbor, New York City, United States.

The Statue of Liberty may also refer to:

Other statues
 Liberty Statue (Budapest), a monument on the Gellért Hill in Budapest, Hungary
 Statue of Liberty (Leicester), a small replica of the Statue of Liberty installed at the Soar River bridges in Leicester
 Statue of Liberty (Mytilene), a bronze statue erected at the harbor of Mytilene, on the island of Lesbos, in Greece
 Statue of Liberty (Seattle), a replica of the Statue of Liberty installed at Alki Beach Park, Seattle, Washington, U.S.
 Statue of Liberty (Vaasa), a bronze statue erected at the Market Square of Vaasa, in Finland
 Statue of Liberty (Lima), a bronze statue located at the Plaza Francia of Lima, Peru
 Replicas of the Statue of Liberty

Other uses
 Statue of Liberty (juggling), a juggling pattern variant of the shower pattern
 "Statue of Liberty" (song), a 1978 song by XTC
 Statue of Liberty Bike, a bespoke Orange County Choppers motorcycle dedicated to the statue and freedom, that incorporates artifacts and materials from the statue
 Statue of Liberty Division, a U.S. Army unit
 Statue of Liberty Museum
 Statue of Liberty National Monument, New Jersey and New York, United States
 Statue of Liberty play, a trick play in American football
 The Statue of Liberty (film), a 1985 American documentary
 Working on the Statue of Liberty, a 1946 painting by Norman Rockwell

See also
 Freedom Monument (disambiguation)
 Goddess of Democracy, Tiananmen Square, Beijing, China (1989) 
 Lady Liberty (disambiguation)
 Liberty Island
 Monument of Liberty (disambiguation)
 Statue of Freedom, Washington, D.C., United States
 Statue of Liberty in popular culture